Roure may refer to:

People with the surname
 David De Roure (born 1962), British professor
 Luis Alvarez Roure (born 1976), Puerto Rican painter
 Marta Roure (born 1981), Andorran singer and actress
 Martine Roure (born 1948), French politician
 Sergi Escobar Roure (born 1974), Spanish track cyclist

Places
 Roure, Alpes-Maritimes, France
 Roure, Piedmont, Italy
 Vall-de-roures, also known as Valderrobres, Spain

Other
 El Roure, local name used for the Monastery of Santa María del Roure in Catalonia, Spain
 Palais du Roure, Avignon, France